Estonian Sports Association Kalev is a sports association in Estonia, founded in 1901.

History 
The association was founded in 1901 in Tallinn as the Kalev Amateur Cyclist Society. In 1908, a tennis club was established at the society. Later it was joined by sections of athletics, swimming, football, Greco-Roman wrestling, rowing etc. In the 1920s, a basketball club was also set up at the organization.

In 1940, with the Soviet occupation of Estonia, Kalev was dissolved and its facilities were taken over by the Soviet All-Union Sports Society Dynamo. After World War II, in 1944 the Republican Volunteer Sports Society "Kalev" was formed by the Soviet authorities. At its peak during the Estonian SSR, it had 177,1 thousand members.

The sports association continued its activities after the restoration of Estonian independence. A 6 kroon, 50 senti postage stamp was issued to celebrate its centenary in 2001.

Kalevi Mängud (Kalev's Games) is an event organized by Kalev. The most recent one, III Kalevi Mängud, was held in 2006.

Honours 
In various competitions, including World Championships and the Olympic Games, members of Kalev have won a total of more than 400 medals. Among the most famous ones are chess player Paul Keres and Olympic gold winners – wrestler Johannes Kotkas, cyclist Aavo Pikkuus, volleyball player Viljar Loor, basketball player Tiit Sokk and skier Kristina Šmigun.

Gallery

See also 
 JK Tallinna Kalev
 BC Kalev/Cramo
 BC Tallinna Kalev

References

External links
 

Sports organizations of Estonia
1900s establishments in Estonia
Sports organizations established in 1901